Ingars Dude (born 1 January 1987) is a Latvian handball player for Limoges Hand 87 and the Latvian national team.

He represented Latvia at the 2020 European Men's Handball Championship.

References

1987 births
Living people
Latvian male handball players
Expatriate handball players
Latvian expatriate sportspeople in France
Latvian expatriate sportspeople in Germany